Alex Man Chi-leung is a Golden Horse Award-winning Hong Kong actor. Born in Hong Kong to Hakka parents, Alex Man became a television actor for ATV in the 1970s. He joined TVB in the 1980s where he starred in several popular television dramas. Man sang the Hakka song, "客家山歌最出名", during a Hong Kong TVB television show specially made for him.

Filmography

Films

Television

References

External links
 
 
 
 

Hong Kong male film actors
1957 births
Living people
Indigenous inhabitants of the New Territories in Hong Kong
Hong Kong people of Hakka descent
People from Bao'an County
Communication University of China alumni
Adoptees